Audubon Center at Bent of the River is a 700-acre preserve in Southbury, Connecticut. It is located off South Britain Road and is open year-round.

The Center's mission is to conserve land and promote biodiversity. Its website states "When Mrs. Althea Clark bequeathed Bent of the River farm to National Audubon Society, she left explicit instructions about its use for education and the maintenance of the land— such as preserving it for native flora and fauna and having no trail blazes or interpretive signs. She wanted the Bent to be kept in a state of "mild wildness."

The property features about 15 miles of trails through fields, forests, shrub and grasslands along the Pomperaug River, and is considered to be an excellent site for bird watching. The property includes a brick house named the Clark House and a mid-19th century barn used for nature education programs and events.

References

External links

 Audubon Center Bent of the River

Nature reserves in Connecticut
Protected areas of New Haven County, Connecticut
Southbury, Connecticut
Audubon movement
Nature centers in Connecticut